Pondok Rajeg Station is an inactive railway station located at the borders of Jatimulya, Cilodong, Depok city and Pondok Rajeg, Cibinong, Bogor Regency in West Java, Indonesia. The station located at an elevation of +121 meters, is included in the Jakarta Operation Area I.

The origins of the construction of this station can be traced to the master plan for the construction of the Jakarta Outer Ring Railway line made by the Ministry of Transportation of the Republic of Indonesia in the early 1990s. The goal is that freight trains do not enter the Special Capital Region of Jakarta area. The route is from Parung Panjang Station to Cikarang Station. However, the 1997 Asian financial crisis caused the plan to stop halfway, so the rail line only reached Nambo station. To fill this empty route slot, the Nambo diesel multiple unit ( or KRD) line was operated from 1999 to 2006. In 2006, the KRD line stopped operating because the DMUs was old and unfit for operation. Automatically, all stations and tracks were also deactivated.

Currently, Pondok Rajeg Station cannot be operated. It is in a dilapidated, deplorable and unkempt condition since 2013 and the entire station is full of vandalism. At night, this place is often used as a place to hang out while enjoying the KRL and Nambo cement trains passing by.

On 3 June 2021, the Jabodetabek Transportation Management Agency ( or BPTJ) along with the head of the Departement of Transportation of Depok (Kadishub Kota Depok) and the representatives of the Depok City Government carried out a field study as an effort to follow up on the reactivation of this station. Starting the rebuilding process, the old building and station platform have been demolished since 12 June 2022.

References

Bogor Regency
Railway stations in West Java
Defunct railway stations in Indonesia
Railway stations opened in 1997
Railway stations closed in 2006